Tommi Vesala (born 12 January 1986) is a Finnish football player currently playing for Finnish Veikkausliiga side HIFK. Vesala began his career as a junior in FC Kasiysi. During his senior career he played at Finnish second and third tiers, Ykkönen and Kakkonen, in FC Espoo, FC Hämeenlinna and FC Viikingit before joining Veikkausliiga side Myllykosken Pallo for the season 2011. He made his league debut on 12 May 2011.

After successful season in 2014, HIFK introduced Vesala as their new player with a contract length of one year.

Playing style
Vesala is described as being very versatile player with capability to play in many different roles, for example as a winger or a midfielder. First of all he's being praised of his work rate and being a player who pushes himself to the limits for the good of the whole team.

Personal life
In addition to his professional football career, Vesala is also a dentist. He's also a musician in a band called And the Band, which is formed by other members Tero Karhu and Eetu Kaipio. Vesala lives in Kallio, a central district of Helsinki.

References

  Profile at veikkausliiga.com

1986 births
Living people
Finnish footballers
FC Hämeenlinna players
Myllykosken Pallo −47 players
Veikkausliiga players
FC Viikingit players
FC Espoo players
Association football defenders